Hume Studies is an interdisciplinary journal that publishes articles on the philosophical thought of David Hume. It is published by the Hume Society in April and November issues. There is open access to the journal's first 30 volumes, which are available in their issue archive. Members of the Hume Society have online access to all volumes.

See also 
 List of philosophy journals

References

External links 
 Hume Society Official Website
Hume Studies Issue Archive

Biannual journals
English-language journals
Publications established in 1975
Hume, David
Works about David Hume
Philosophy Documentation Center academic journals